The murder of Jodi Jones is a Scottish murder case from June 2003 in which a 14-year-old schoolgirl was murdered in woodland in Dalkeith, Scotland. Her semi-nude body was discovered behind a wall by her 14-year-old boyfriend Luke Mitchell’s dog Mia, hours after her death. An autopsy revealed the teenager had died of several stab and slash wounds—primarily inflicted to her neck and torso, with a defensive wound to her arm.

Mitchell rapidly became a prime suspect in Jones's murder. He was arrested on 14 April 2004, convicted of her murder on 11 January 2005 at age 16, and sentenced to serve a minimum of 20 years' imprisonment. Mitchell continues to protest his innocence, and several attempts to overturn his conviction have failed.

Background

Mitchell
Luke Mitchell was born on 24 July 1988, the younger of two children. His parents separated when he was 11, and he was raised by his mother, Corinne, in relatively comfortable circumstances in Newbattle with hobbies that included music, riding horses, and motorbikes. Mitchell went to St David's RC High School in Dalkeith. He was considered a good pupil, although one teacher is known to have expressed concern about the violence in an essay he had written.

Mitchell was in the school year above Jodi Jones and him and her along with various other pupils smoked cannabis on the school premises. The two began a relationship in around February 2003, when both were 14 years old, with Mitchell being Jones's first serious boyfriend. Jones soon became smitten with Mitchell, and their relationship soon became sexual. One entry in Jones's diary dating from the spring or early summer of 2003 reads: "'I think I am actually in love with Luke. Not in a stupid way, I mean real love. God, I think I would die if he finished with me ... If I am crying, he hugs me and strokes my face. He is just so sweet. No matter what he says I believe him."

Jones
Jodi Jones was born in 1989 in Easthouses, the youngest of three children born to James and Judy Jones. She was born into a working class family, with both of her parents working for the Royal Mail. Jones has been described as a bright, "level-headed" and headstrong child who displayed a flair for painting and poetry and who was particularly close with her older sister, Janine. She was affectionately known by her mother as her "wee mentor".

In 1998, Jones's father committed suicide. His death caused great distress to the family and Jones's mother gave up her work in order to care for her three children. Jones's older sister briefly relocated to Mayfield to live with her grandmother to distance herself from the trauma, but soon returned to her family home.

As a teenager, Jones developed a streak of rebellion; she is known to have frequently adjusted her image and to have alternately dyed her hair colours such as pink or green, to have developed an interest in heavy metal bands such as Metallica and, by age 14, to have experimented with marijuana and alcohol. When she entered into a relationship with Mitchell, she initially kept the relationship a secret from her family, confiding only in her sister, Janine. Shortly thereafter, Janine (then 19) informed her mother of her younger sister's boyfriend. In May 2003, Mitchell met the Jones family for the first time.

In the weeks immediately before she was murdered, Jones's social life—which largely revolved around Mitchell—was curtailed by her mother after she discovered her daughter had begun taking drugs. The restriction on her meeting her boyfriend was lifted on 30 June.

Jones and Mitchell frequently met via one traversing through a stretch of woodland to meet the other. A section of this woodland is known as Roan's Dyke Path.

Discovery
At about 5 pm on 30 June 2003, Jones left her home, informing her family she was going to see Mitchell. Her body was found several hours later on the route she invariably took to meet her boyfriend; she had been bound and murdered.

Jones's body was located in a wooded area behind a high wall along Roan's Dyke Path. She had been killed with a knife. The injuries sustained by Jones closely resembled those of actress Elizabeth Short, who was murdered in 1947 and was popularly referred to by media as the Black Dahlia. The initials LM and JJ had been carved into a tree near the crime scene. Mitchell's dog, which was being trained to track, allegedly stopped at a "V"-shaped notch in the wall, where Mitchell climbed through, locating her body at 10.30 pm, while members of her family, also out searching for her, remained on the other side. The ease in which Mitchell was able to find the body was later used in court to suggest guilt. The Jones family made it known that Mitchell was not welcome at the funeral.

Suspicion falls on Mitchell
School authorities cited concern about Mitchell's safety in unsuccessfully attempting to prevent his return to school; two months after the murder he was suspended after objecting to being separated from other pupils.

After the discovery of the body, Mitchell was initially questioned as a witness; he quickly became the main focus of the investigation. Ten months later he was arrested and charged with the crime. He was also charged with the possession of a knife or knives in public places, including St David's High School, and of supplying cannabis. The timing of this meant that he could be tried as an adult in court. Police were later criticised for infringing his human rights by questioning him without a solicitor present.

During a search of his home, detectives confiscated a copy of The Golden Age of Grotesque by Marilyn Manson containing the short film Doppelherz. It was purchased two days after Jones's death. A ten-minute excerpt from the film, as well as several paintings by Manson depicting the Black Dahlia's mutilated body, were presented as evidence during the trial.

Trial
At his trial at the High Court of Justiciary in Edinburgh, Mitchell pleaded not guilty and lodged a special defence of alibi: that he was at home cooking dinner at the time of the murder. He did not testify.

Prosecution case 
A woman testified that she had seen someone resembling Mitchell near the murder scene.

Mitchell was seen as having "guilty knowledge"; in finding the body, the prosecution said he had demonstrated that he already knew where it was. A witness claimed seeing two people resembling Mitchell and Jones at the Easthouses end of the path around 4.50pm with another two witnesses claiming to see Mitchell at the Newbattle end 50 minutes later. Mitchell's brother testified that he had been viewing internet pornography in the house at the time Mitchell said he had been there; under cross-examination Mitchell's brother said he would only have done this if he thought the house to be otherwise empty, and also said that he had not seen Mitchell in the house that afternoon, thereby failing to corroborate Mitchell's defence of being in the family home at the time of the murder.

The prosecution also believed Mitchell had taken an interest in the Black Dahlia case. A knife pouch was found in Mitchell's home on which he had marked "JJ 1989 – 2003" and "The finest day I ever had was when tomorrow never came". The prosecution said it would be unlikely for anyone but the killer to remember someone killed with a knife in this way. The missing knife was never recovered. According to the prosecution, Mitchell's clothes were destroyed in an  diameter garden log burner later that night. His mother Corrinne bought him a new coat and denied the existence of his previous one.

Defence arguments
No genetic material from Mitchell, which could not be "innocently explained", was found on her body. Jodi's DNA was found on Mitchell's trousers but this could have occurred through an "innocent transfer". One hundred and twenty-two items taken from the murder scene from which attempts to obtain DNA profiles proved unsuccessful. No forensic evidence was recovered from the incinerator. Mitchell was the subject of intense press coverage before his trial.

In response to the prosecution accusation that only prior knowledge could have explained the way Mitchell was able to discover the body lying in an area behind a wall, lawyers for Mitchell said he had been aided by his dog. To allow the jury to explore the plausibility of these claims, a mock-up wall was erected in the Laigh Hall, below Parliament Hall within Parliament House, where the trial was being heard. A visit by the jury to the murder scene was also arranged.

Verdict and sentence 
On 20 January 2005, the jury began their deliberations; these deliberations concluded the following day. On 21 January, the jury found Mitchell guilty by a majority verdict of Jones's murder after a total of five hours of deliberation. He was also found guilty of supplying cannabis. The trial had taken 42 days, a record at the time for a single person upon trial in Scotland.

Upon receipt of the jury's verdict, Judge Lord Nimmo Smith informed Mitchell: "It lies beyond any skill of mine to look into the black depths of your mind; I can only look at what you have done. You have been convicted of a truly evil murder—one of the most appalling crimes that any of us can remember—and you will rightly be regarded as wicked." Mitchell's sentencing was delayed in order for the minimum term he should serve before being considered for release could be determined. On 11 February 2005. Judge Smith informed Mitchell that he would spend a minimum of 20 years in prison before being considered for parole.

Appeals
In March 2006, Mitchell was granted leave to appeal against his conviction (and his length of sentence) at the High Court of Justiciary sitting as the Court of Criminal Appeal in Edinburgh, on the grounds that the trial judge should have moved the trial outside the city. The Court of Criminal Appeal in Edinburgh heard Mitchell's appeal in February 2008, and in May 2008 his original conviction was upheld by Lord Osborne, Lord Kingarth and Lord Hamilton. They ruled that there was sufficient evidence in law that Mitchell could be convicted on and rejected his other grounds of appeal, although they stated that the way police had questioned Mitchell on 14 August 2003 had been "outrageous" and was "to be deplored."

On 2 February 2011, Mitchell's appeal against sentence was refused by a two to one majority. Lord Justice Clerk, Lord Gill, sitting with Lord Hardie and Lady Cosgrove, stated that he had the utmost sympathy for the family of the victim and that he understood entirely why this murder should have caused such public revulsion. Nevertheless, he was of the opinion that the sentencing judge should not have imposed a punishment part of the sentence of such severity on such a young offender. He stated that justice would be done in this case if the punishment part were fixed at 15 years. He did not consider that they were precluded from that disposal by anything said in the guidance given in HM Adv v Boyle and Ors (supra). He regretted, therefore, that he had to differ from his Lordship and her Ladyship.

Cadder appeal refused 
On 15 April 2011, Mitchell's bid to challenge his conviction for murder following a human rights ruling by the Supreme Court in the Cadder case was rejected. His lawyer told the Appeal Court in Edinburgh that his trial was unfair because he had no access to a lawyer during an interview. Lord Osborne sitting with Lord Hamilton (Lord Justice General) and Lord Kingarth told Mitchell that the application for leave to lodge the additional ground was refused. The appellant's appeal against sentence was finally disposed of on 2 February 2011 and in such circumstances there did not exist a live appeal in respect of which leave could be granted under section 110(4).

In November 2011, Mitchell was refused leave to take his appeal to the Supreme Court of the United Kingdom, on the basis that his previous appeal had been dealt with before the Cadder ruling and could therefore not be re-opened.

SCCRC 
On 20 July 2012, lawyers acting for Mitchell launched a fresh bid to have his conviction overturned when a 300-page dossier was delivered to the Scottish Criminal Cases Review Commission (SCCRC). The dossier included claims that a Mitchell lookalike may have confused eyewitnesses. The lawyers donated their services free of charge.

In July 2014, the SCCRC ruled that police officers breached Luke Mitchell's human rights when they questioned him over the murder of Jones, but determined he was not the victim of a miscarriage of justice. The SCCRC report stated that, despite Mitchell's claims that he was innocent, there are no grounds to challenge the guilty verdict. Immediately after the decision by the SCCRC, it was announced that Mitchell would take his case to the European Courts; the competency of such a move was questionable since the ECHR has a strict six-month deadline for applications. In 2017, Mitchell was reported to be working on another appeal. In 2019, GoFundMe deleted an appeal to raise funds for Mitchell led by Sandra Lean, saying it breached their terms of service.

Television programmes 
In May 2007, a BBC Scotland Frontline Scotland documentary examined a theory that the murder might have been committed by a student who was alleged to have handed in an essay about killing a girl in the woods a few weeks before the murder. A friend of this suspect saw him soon after the murder and claimed that he had scratches on his face. The documentary also challenged the theory that Mitchell was an obsessive Marilyn Manson fan and had a keen interest in the Black Dahlia murder, stating that there is no evidence that Mitchell knew of the Dahlia case until after the murder. Professor Anthony Busuttil pointed out dissimilarities between the injuries to Jodi Jones and those to the Black Dahlia victim Elizabeth Short.

In 2021, Channel 5 aired Murder in a Small Town, which raised the possibility that five other suspects could have been the murderer. The show, which was watched by 1.5 million people, was the subject of complaints to Ofcom, including one from a witness in the trial. Jones's family objected to the implication in the show that they were part of a cover-up. Tom Wood, who was second in command of Lothian and Borders Police at the time of the murder, called the programme "very one-sided" and pointed out that Mitchell's appeals had been unsuccessful.

See also

Age of criminal responsibility
List of solved missing person cases

Notes

References

Cited works and further reading

External links
 Contemporary news article pertaining to the murder of Jodi Jones
 Daily Telegraph press article detailing the trial of Luke Mitchell
 January 2005 BBC News article detailing Mitchell's conviction of Jones's murder
 Luke Mitchell v. Her Majesty's Advocate: Details of Mitchell's 2010 petition to appeal his conviction

2003 in Scotland
2003 murders in the United Kingdom
Dalkeith
Deaths by person in Scotland
Deaths by stabbing in the United Kingdom
Female murder victims
History of Midlothian
Incidents of violence against girls
June 2003 crimes
June 2003 events in the United Kingdom
Murder committed by minors
Murder in Scotland